Scytasis nitida is a species of beetle in the family Cerambycidae. It was described by Francis Polkinghorne Pascoe in 1867. It is known from Sumatra and Borneo. It contains the varietas Scytasis nitida var. anticerufa.

References

Saperdini
Beetles described in 1867